The tirailleurs malgaches were a corps of French colonial infantry established in Madagascar.

Overview
After the annexation of Madagascar by France in 1896, Malagasy troops were recruited, and the Tirailleurs malgaches were formed along similar lines to the Senegalese Tirailleurs, forming part of the Troupes coloniales of the French Armed Forces. In 1905, there were three regiments, each of three battalions apiece, stationed at Tananarive, Tamatave and Diego Suarez.

World War I

During World War I, the governor general of the colony, Hubert Garbit, organised the mobilisation of the Malagasy population. The first contingent was sent in October 1915 to France, followed by five others in 1916. Like their Tirailleurs indochinois counterparts the Tirailleurs malgaches battalions were initially employed behind the lines in guard, depot and factory-worker duties, rather than being deployed in a fighting role. 
 A total of 26 battalions were formed between 1916 and 1918. These were garrisoned mainly at the camps of Fréjus and Puget-sur-Argens in the Var, and most were dissolved in 1918, with around 15,000 men being transferred to the artillery. Three battalions performed rear echelon duties with the Armée d'Orient (1915–1919) on the Macedonian front. The 12e bataillon de tirailleurs malgaches was the only battalion to be awarded the Fourragère of the Croix de guerre 1914–1918 (France) for three unit citations. Up until 22 July 1918, it formed part of the highly decorated 1st Moroccan Infantry Division.

45,863 Malagasys served in the ranks of the French Army (including 41,355 in combat roles). Of these 10,000 were incorporated into heavy artillery regiments. A total of 3,101 Malagasy soldiers were killed or reported missing and 1,835 injured.

Post WWI
In 1926 the Malagasy units were redesignated as the 1st and 2nd regiments mixte de Madagascar. These in turn were disbanded in November 1942, following the British occupation of the island. Reformed in 1946, the RMM lost their specific Malagasy identity after 1957 when merged into the mainstream Troupes de Marine.

Uniforms
Throughout their history the Tirailleurs malgaches wore the same dark blue or khaki uniforms as the Tirailleurs senegalais on which they were modelled. The only distinction was the substitution of the letters TM for TS on the collar patches.

References

Notes

References

Bibliography

External links
  Website of the military museum in Fréjus dedicated to Troupes coloniales of France

Army units and formations of France
Colonial troops